The 25th Canadian Parliament was in session from September 27, 1962, until February 6, 1963. The membership was set by the 1962 federal election on June 18, 1962, and it changed only somewhat due to resignations and by-elections until it was dissolved prior to the 1963 election.

It was controlled by a Progressive Conservative Party minority under Prime Minister John Diefenbaker and the 18th Canadian Ministry.  The Official Opposition was the Liberal Party, led by Lester B. Pearson.

It was the third shortest parliament in Canadian history.

The Speaker was Marcel Lambert.  See also List of Canadian electoral districts 1952-1966 for a list of the ridings in this parliament.

There was only one session of the 25th Parliament.

List of members

Following is a full list of members of the twenty-fifth Parliament listed first by province or territory, then by electoral district.

Electoral districts denoted by an asterisk (*) indicates that district was represented by two members.

Alberta

British Columbia

Manitoba

New Brunswick

Newfoundland

Northwest Territories

Nova Scotia

Ontario

Prince Edward Island

Quebec

Saskatchewan

Yukon

By-elections

References

Succession

Canadian parliaments
1962 establishments in Canada
1963 disestablishments in Canada
1962 in Canadian politics
1963 in Canadian politics